Kinks is the debut studio album by the English rock band the Kinks.

The album was re-released in 1998 in the UK on Castle Records with twelve bonus tracks. This reissue was itself reissued in 2004 on the Sanctuary label. A deluxe edition was released on 28 March 2011.

Reception

Consequence of Sound listed the album as a key example of proto-punk, observing “lean aggression” and a “jolting”, “in-your-face” approach, and described their rendition of Chuck Berry’s “Beautiful Delilah” as the first punk rock cover.

The AllMusic review by Richie Unterberger assessed the album as lacking in consistency, commenting: "As R&B cover artists, the Kinks weren't nearly as adept as the Stones and Yardbirds; Ray Davies' original tunes were, "You Really Got Me" aside, perfunctory Mersey Beat-ish pastiches... [the] tunes that producer Shel Talmy penned for the group... were simply abominable."

Rock critic Mike Saunders of Rolling Stone had a more positive opinion of the Kinks' debut LP, described the album as one of their "successful rock and roll albums".

Track listing

In all markets except the US 
All tracks are written by Ray Davies unless otherwise noted.

Side one
"Beautiful Delilah" (Chuck Berry)2:07
"So Mystifying"2:58
"Just Can't Go to Sleep"1:58
"Long Tall Shorty"(Don Covay, Herb Abramson)2:50
"I Took My Baby Home"1:48
"I'm a Lover Not a Fighter" (J. D. "Jay" Miller)2:03
"You Really Got Me"2:13

Side two
"Cadillac" (Ellas McDaniel)2:44
"Bald Headed Woman" (Shel Talmy)2:41
"Revenge" (Davies, Larry Page)1:29
"Too Much Monkey Business" (Berry)2:16
"I've Been Driving on Bald Mountain" (Talmy)2:01
"Stop Your Sobbing"2:06
"Got Love If You Want It" (James Moore)3:46

Original US release 
All tracks are written by Ray Davies except where noted.

Side one
"Beautiful Delilah" (Berry)2:04
"So Mystifying"2:49
"Just Can't Go to Sleep"1:58
"Long Tall Shorty" (Covay, Abramson)2:48
"You Really Got Me"2:13

Side two
"Cadillac" (McDaniel)2:41
"Bald Headed Woman" (Talmy)2:41
"Too Much Monkey Business" (Berry)2:14
"I've Been Driving on Bald Mountain" (Talmy)2:02
"Stop Your Sobbing"2:05
"Got Love If You Want It" (Moore)3:49

Personnel
According to band researcher Doug Hinman:

The Kinks
Ray Davies lead and backing vocals, rhythm guitar, harmonica; lead guitar 
Dave Davies backing vocals, electric guitar; lead vocal 
Pete Quaife backing vocals, bass guitar
Mick Avory drums ; tambourine, maracas

Additional musicians
Rasa Didzpetris backing vocals 
Perry Ford piano 
Bobby Graham drums 
Arthur Greenslade piano 
Jon Lord organ 
Jimmy Page twelve-string acoustic guitar 
Unknown session musician rhythm guitar 

Production
Shel Talmy producer
Bob Auger engineer

Charts

Notes

References

Sources 

 
 

1964 debut albums
The Kinks albums
Albums produced by Shel Talmy
Pye Records albums
Reprise Records albums
British rock-and-roll albums